15 Cancri is an α2 CVn-type variable star in the zodiac constellation of Cancer, located around 980 light years away. It has the variable star designation BM Cancri (BM Cnc); 15 Cancri (15 Cnc) is the Flamsteed designation. This system is visible to the naked eye as a faint, white-hued star with an apparent visual magnitude of about 5.6. It is moving away from the Earth with a heliocentric radial velocity of 25 km/s.

Radial velocity measurements taken at the Dominion Astrophysical Observatory in Victoria, British Columbia Canada in 1918 and 1919 led to the determination that 15 Cancri is a single-lined spectroscopic binary system. The first orbit was calculated in 1973 by Helmut Abt and Michael Snowden with a period of 585 days however later measurements showed that the orbital period was 635 days.

15 Cancri A, the visible component, is an Ap star, a chemically peculiar star with an over-abundance of iron peak elements, particularly silicon, chromium, and strontium, in its spectrum.

Like all Ap stars, 15 Cancri has a strong magnetic field. This magnetic field varies as it rotates and in 1968 the visual brightness of the star was shown to vary regularly over about four days.  15 Cancri was given the variable star designation BM Cancri in 1972 as a member of the α2 CVn class of variable stars.

Notes

References

Cancer (constellation)
Alpha2 Canum Venaticorum variables
Ap stars
A-type main-sequence stars
Spectroscopic binaries
Cancri, 15
Cancri, BM
Durchmusterung objects
068351
3215
040240